Molecular and Cellular Biology is a biweekly peer-reviewed scientific journal covering all aspects of molecular and cellular biology. It is published by the American Society for Microbiology and the editor-in-chief is Peter Tontonoz (University of California, Los Angeles). It was established in 1981. The h-index (1981-2021) is 338.

Abstracting and indexing
The journal is abstracted and indexed in:

According to the Journal Citation Reports, the journal has a 2021 impact factor of 5.069.

References

External links 

Molecular and cellular biology journals
Delayed open access journals
Publications established in 1981
English-language journals
Biweekly journals
American Society for Microbiology academic journals